Lehigh Township is a township in Marion County, Kansas, United States.  As of the 2010 census, the township population was 329, including the city of Lehigh.

Geography

Cities and towns
The township contains the following settlements:
 City of Lehigh.
 Ghost town of Waldeck.

Cemeteries
The township contains the following cemeteries:
 Lehigh Mennonite Cemetery, located in Section 27 T19S R1E.
 Lehigh Township Cemetery (aka Dalke Cemetery), located in Section 21 T19S R1E.
 Mennonite Brethren Church Cemetery, located in Section 27 T19S R1E.
 Silberfeld Community Cemetery (no longer in use), located in Section 1 T19S R1E.

Transportation
K-15 and U.S. Route 56 highways pass through the township.

References

Further reading

External links
 Marion County website
 City-Data.com
 Marion County maps: Current, Historic, KDOT

Townships in Marion County, Kansas
Townships in Kansas